The Big Dick Dudley Memorial Show was an annual professional wrestling memorial event produced by the USA Pro Wrestling (USA Pro) promotion, held between 2002 and 2003. The show was held in memory of Big Dick Dudley, who died of kidney failure at his apartment in Copiague, New York on May 16, 2002, with a portion of the proceeds going to his family. A collection from the audience was taken up during the shows as well. The event also served as a reunion show for former alumni of Extreme Championship Wrestling, where Dudley had spent much of his career as a member of The Dudley Brothers, as many appeared at the show to pay their respects.

Predating the Hardcore Homecoming shows of later years, ECW wrestlers that participated were generally those already actively competing in the promotion and elsewhere on the independent circuit. It was also the first of many memorial shows held for former ECW stars followed by the Ted Petty Memorial Invitational Tournament (2002-2008), the Chris Candido Memorial Tag Team Tournament (2005), Chris Candido Memorial Show (2005-2006), Chris Candido Memorial J-Cup (2005-) and the Pitbull/Public Enemy Tag Team Memorial Cup (2006).

Show results

First Annual Big Dick Dudley Memorial Show (2002)
June 8, 2002 in Franklin Square, New York (Franklin Square Firehouse)

Second Annual Big Dick Dudley Memorial Show (2003)
May 31, 2003 in Franklin Square, New York (Franklin Square Firehouse)

References

External links
USA Pro Big Dick Dudley Memorial Show (6/8/02) results at USAProWrestling.com
USA Pro 2nd Annual Big Dick Dudley Memorial Event (5/31/03) results at USAProWrestling.com

Professional wrestling memorial shows
2002 in professional wrestling
2003 in professional wrestling
Professional wrestling in New York (state)